The Philippine two-peso note (Filipino: Dalawang Piso) (₱2) was a denomination of Philippine currency. On its final release, José Rizal was featured on the front side of the bill, while the Declaration of the Philippine Independence was featured on the reverse side.

This banknote was circulated until it was demonetized in 1993.  Its printing was ceased in 1983, when it was replaced by coins upon the introduction of the Flora and Fauna coin series.

History

Pre-independence
1903: Philippine Islands issued silver certificates. Features a portrait of José Rizal.

1916: PNB issued notes. Features a portrait of José Rizal.
1918-1929: Philippine Treasury Certificates issued with a portrait of José Rizal.

1937: Philippine Commonwealth issued treasury certificate. Features a portrait of José Rizal. This series were later overprinted with the word "VICTORY" on the reverse after the liberation of the Philippines under Japanese rule in 1944.
1949: Philippine Treasury Certificates issued with VICTORY

Version history

Independence
1951: English series, Features the portrait of José Rizal, the national hero of the Philippines. The reverse features the landing of Ferdinand Magellan in the Philippines in 1521.
1973: The denomination was not included upon the introduction of the Pilipino series bills. It was later introduced in the Ang Bagong Lipunan series. The banknote adopts the design elements from the demonetized one peso bill; Rizal's profile is featured on the obverse, and on the reverse, it featured the Declaration of the Philippine Independence. The note is predominantly blue in color.
1985: The two peso bill was not included when the New Design series was introduced and was later replaced by coins two years before. The banknote was officially demonetized, together with the other Ang Bagong Lipunan series banknotes on February 2, 1993.

Version history

Commemorative issues
Throughout its existence, the two peso bill has been overprinted to commemorate certain events:
Papal visit of Pope John Paul II: In 1981, Bangko Sentral ng Pilipinas issued a commemorative banknote for the visit of Pope John Paul II in the Philippines. The overprint features his coat of arms and around it is "PAGDALAW NG PAPA JUAN PABLO II - PEB 17-22, 1981".

Printing years

References 

Philippines currency history
Two-base-unit banknotes